Binson-et-Orquigny is a former commune of the Marne department in northeastern France. On 1 January 2023, it was merged into the new commune of Cœur-de-la-Vallée.

Population

See also
Communes of the Marne department

References

Former communes of Marne (department)